The Turkish Revenge Brigade (TİT), also referred as the Turkish Vengeance Brigade, is a militant Turkish nationalist organisation that has used violence against those they perceive as insulting Turkey. In the political violence of the 1970s, TİT gained notoriety during political clashes and is believed to be responsible for over 1,000 deaths during this period. After the military coup of 1980, most of its members were arrested. They were later released and assisted Turkish military intelligence in operations during the Kurdish-Turkish conflict.

Activity

1979
In 1979, police arrested a man named Cengiz Ayhan in Mersin on charges of being the leader of the Turkish Revenge Brigade. Ayhan denied the charges and claimed he was falsely accused of involvement in the group due to his opposition to leftist groups in Turkey.

1993
According to Human Rights Watch, the murders of parliamentary deputy Mehmet Sincar and the journalist Ferhat Tepe in 1993 were carried out in TİT's name.  Later, it was found that Sincar was assassinated by Turkish Hezbollah, who intended to assassinate Nizamettin Toğuç.

1996
In 1996, it is reported that they were involved with the murder of Turkish Cypriot journalist Kutlu Adalı.

1998
TİT claimed responsibility for an armed attack in 1998 on the then Turkish Human Rights Association president, Akın Birdal, in which he was critically wounded. The perpetrator was the TİT's leader, Mehmet Cemal Kulaksızoğlu received a diplomatic passport by rogue National Intelligence Organization officer, Yavuz Ataç. That time Mehmet Cemal Kulaksızoglu never serve with Ataç but they were close friends. The boss of Kulaksizoglu was Mehmet Eymür.

2005
Human Rights Association President, Eren Keskin and two HRA board members received death threats while in Istanbul.

2006
On September 12, 2006, in Diyarbakır, ten civilians were killed (7 of them children) and 17 wounded by a bomb placed next to an elementary school. According to Guardian Unlimited, Associated Press, and the BBC, Kurdistan Freedom Hawks (TAK) claimed responsibility. According to Akşam, TİT claimed responsibility.

2008 
In 2008, a man named Vatan Bölükbaşı was arrested during the Ergenekon trials. Bölükbaşı later identified himself as a member of TİT and said that he is moving by orders of Veli Küçük.

References

Paramilitary organizations based in Turkey
Far-right politics in Turkey
Turkish nationalist organizations
Anti-communist organizations